The 150th Mixed Brigade was a unit of the Spanish Republican Army created during the Spanish Civil War. Located in front of Madrid, it did not play a relevant role throughout the war.

History 
The unit was created on June 11, 1937 in Madrid with battalions from the 7th, 43rd, 67th and 75th mixed brigades, initially receiving from Mixed Brigade «A». It received its definitive numbering after the Battle of Brunete, which had previously used by an International Brigade.

The initial commander of the brigade was the infantry commander Ángel Roig Jorquera, who shortly after was replaced by the militia major Eduardo Zamora Conde. The head of the General Staff fell to the militia captain Miguel Soto Añibarro, while Francisco Ortuño was the political commissioner. During the war the brigade was assigned to the 13th and 18th divisions, remaining situated on the quiet front of Madrid. At the beginning of February 1939 it was garrisoning the road from Pozuelo to Torres and the road from Campo Real to Torres, in the Corpa sector, located in front of the nationalist 13th Division.

Command 
 Commanders
 Infantry Commander Ángel Roig Jorquera;
 Militia major Eduardo Zamora Conde;
 Militia major Vicente Ibars Ronda;

 Commissars
 Óscar Sánchez Gil, of the PS/CNT;

References

Bibliography 
 
 

Military units and formations established in 1937
Military units and formations disestablished in 1939
Mixed Brigades (Spain)
Military units and formations of the Spanish Civil War
Military history of Spain
Armed Forces of the Second Spanish Republic